Exoclavarctus is a genus of tardigrades in the family Halechiniscidae. Its only species is Exoclavarctus dineti. The species has been found in the deep sea in the Bay of Biscay.

References

Further reading
Renaud-Mornant, 1983: "Tardigrades abyssaux nouveaux de la sous-famille des Euclavarctinae n. subfam. (Arthrotardigrada, Halechiniscidae)." [New Deep Sea Tardigrades in the Subfamily Euclavarctinae n. subfam. (Arthrotardigrada, Halechiniscidae)]. Bulletin of the Muséum National d'Histoire Naturelle Section A: Zoology, Biology and Animal Ecology, 1983, vol. 5, no. 1, p. 201-219

Halechiniscidae
Fauna of the Atlantic Ocean
Animals described in 1983
Taxa named by Jeanne Renaud-Mornant
Monotypic animal genera
Tardigrade genera